Sarek was a Swedish folk-pop band formed in 2002, taking their name from Sarek National Park. They debuted in 2002 with the single "Vinterland" ("Winter land") and in 2003 they broke through with their single "Genom eld och vatten" ("Through fire and water") in Melodifestivalen. The group parted ways in 2012.

Members 
Stina Engelbrecht (music, lyrics, vocals, chorus, kulning)
Jessica Wetterstrand (vocals)
Zara Kronvall (vocals)
Kristofer Pettersson (nyckelharpa, accordion)
Göran Månsson (flute, jew harp, percussion)

Discography 

Albums
 2003 – Genom eld och vatten
 2004 – Sarek
 2008 – I natt ska marken skälva
 2011 – Magiska toner

Singles
 2002 – Vinterland
 2003 – Genom eld och vatten
 2003 – Solen glimmar
 2004 – Älvorna
 2004 – Medan stjärnorna vandrar
 2004 – Törst
 2004 – Alla änglar log
 2008 – I natt ska marken skälva
 2008 – Magiska sekunder

See also 
 Swedish folk music
 Nordman
 Timoteij
 Drängarna

References

Swedish folk music groups
Melodifestivalen contestants of 2004
Melodifestivalen contestants of 2003